TV1000 was a brand of premium TV channels operated by Viasat World and Viaplay Group (previously by Modern Times Group).

TV1000 may refer to:

V Film, a brand of Nordic movie channels formerly known as TV1000 and Viasat Film
V Series, a Swedish TV channel formerly known as TV1000 Drama
Viasat Film HD, a defunct Nordic movie channel formerly known as TV1000 HD
Viju TV1000, a brand of movie channels available in Russia and CIS
TV1000 Russkoe Kino, a Russian movie channel
Viasat Kino, a Baltic movie channel, formerly known as the Baltic feed of TV1000 East
Viasat Kino Action, formerly known as TV1000 Action East
TV1000 Poland, a defunct Polish movie channel